Cezary Olejniczak (born 12 October 1972) is a Polish politician. Member of the Sejm (2011-2015) for Democratic Left Alliance. Older brother of other Polish left-wing politician Wojciech Olejniczak.

Electoral history

References

1972 births
Living people
People from Łowicz
Democratic Left Alliance politicians
Members of the Polish Sejm 2011–2015